Nina D. Berova is a Professor of Chemistry at Columbia University. She is recognised as a world leader in stereochemistry and chiroptical spectroscopy. Her contributions include the development of porphyrin tweezers. She was the 2007 winner of the Società Chimica Italiana Chirality Medal.

Early life and education 
Berova earned her PhD at the University of Sofia in 1972. She stayed working for the Bulgarian Academy of Sciences for her early career. During this time she worked on chiroptical spectroscopy at Ruhr University Bochum, where she worked under the supervision of Günther Snatzke.

Research and career 
She was made an Associate Professor in Organic Chemistry at Sofia University in 1982, and made a visiting professor at Columbia University in 1988. Soon after she became a Research Professor at Columbia University, working with Koji Nakanishi on chiroptical spectroscopy of natural products. Their work started with the examination of biopolymers using exciton chirality, including pectin classification and the determination of glycosidic bonds.

Berova was the first and only woman to win the Chirality Medal. Berova's citation reads "in recognition of her outstanding achievements in the field of chiroptical spectroscopy and the elucidation of a wide range of important chemical and biological problems related to molecular and supramolecular chirality". She has delivered short courses on chrioptical spectroscopies included Optical Rotatory Dispersion, Circular Dichroism and Raman Optical Activity. She was elected an honorary member of the Italian Chemical Society at the Scuola Normale Superiore di Pisa in 2012.

Selected publications 
Her publications include;

 
 
 
 

Berova has been Editor of the journal Chirality since 1998.

Awards and honours 
Her awards and honours include;

 2003 Italian Chemical Society Piero Pino Gold Medal
 2005 American Chemical Society Editor Award
 2007 Chirality Medal
 2008 Honoured with Special Issue in Chirality
 2009 University of Vigo Lifetime Recognition Award
 2011 Honorary member of the Italian Chemical Society

References 

Living people
Bulgarian women scientists
Bulgarian chemists
Sofia University alumni
Columbia University faculty
Year of birth missing (living people)